Hillsboro High School (colloquially known as Hilhi) is a public high school in Hillsboro, Oregon, United States, and is the oldest high school in the Hillsboro School District. The current campus was built beginning in 1969. Prior to this, the first campus opened in 1913 at 3rd Avenue and Grant Street; the second campus, built in 1928, was located downtown at 6th Avenue and Lincoln Street, where J.B. Thomas Middle School stood until 2009. Currently 1,195 students attend the school in grades 9–12. The official school colors are blue and white with red and black as accents, and the mascot is the Spartan.

The athletics and activities of the school compete in category 5A's Northwest Oregon Conference under the Oregon School Activities Association.

Alumni include professional soccer player Tiffeny Milbrett, hall of fame coach Ad Rutschman, and former professional baseball players Bob Beall and Scott Brow.

Hillsboro High's most recent team state championship came in 2017 for boys' swimming.

As of 2022, the school's graduation rate was 90%.

History
In September 1908, tenth grade was added to the Hillsboro school district, with classes held on the top floor of the school. Eleventh and twelfth grades were soon added, and in June 1911 the first students to complete four years of high school graduated. This class totaled five students, consisting of four girls and one boy. In September 1911, the school added manual training and domestic science courses to the curriculum. That same year, voters approved of a $50,000 bond measure to pay for constructing a high school building, with construction completed in 1913 at a cost of $40,000 for the three story building. In 1913, the school graduated eight students. A gymnasium was built beginning in 1915. The school grew in size, with the 1920 graduating class totally 36 students, the largest number up to that time. As early as the 1910s, "Hilhi" was used as a colloquial name for the school; the 1917 annual yearbook featured the title "The Hilhi" on its cover.

In 1929, a new high school building was completed, with additional buildings and the wings added in later years. Located near downtown Hillsboro, at NE Sixth Avenue and Lincoln Street, the site became a junior high once the current campus was built beginning in 1969. Students complained that the new layout that consisted of classrooms spread out over the campus instead of a single central building was a poor choice for Oregon’s rainy and cold winters.

The school has been remodeled several times since opening in 1969. The first time was around 1980, when some minor updates such as the covered walkways were added. During the summer of 1999 the school received further updates. Blue and beige paint replaced the old brown colors on the buildings, the commons area was built adjacent to the cafeteria, a new auditorium was constructed, a new building was built to house technology related classes, and the main office was remodeled. During the summer of 2008 the locker rooms were remodeled, improving the lighting, showers, and bathrooms. Future plans included the replacement of aging HVAC units and controls by 2011.

In 2003, the school, along with all schools in the district, made national news when 17 days of classes were cut from the school year, which allowed students to begin summer break in May, due to budget cuts to education in Oregon.

Teacher Don Domes won the Software Association of Oregon Foundation's Oregon Technology Educator of Year in 2004.

Since 2006 the school has participated in the MIT-Lemelson InvenTeam program. Through the program, the school has received a $10,000 grant for a team of students to invent a self-installable heads-up display for automotive use and a $4,000 grant to invent an industrial sized robotic vacuum/floor cleaning system.

The former campus near downtown was demolished in 2009.

In the fall of 2015, the school became the first in the district to implement a mariachi band program into the curriculum, started by Hilhi alumni and Choir Director, Benjamin Noyes.

Academics

Hillsboro High School has offered the International Baccalaureate Diploma Programme since 2003, and in 2009, began offering the Middle Years Programme. The school also has an ASPIRE program and a robotics team.

In 2008, 80% of the school's seniors received a high school diploma. Of 364 students, 293 graduated, 39 dropped out, three received a modified diploma, and 29 were still in high school in 2009.

The school's 2020–21 graduation rate was 90%.

Athletics
Hilhi, known as the Spartans, competes in the Northwest Oregon Conference at the OSAA class 5A level. School colors are royal blue and white, and the  athletic director is Steve Drake.

Cross-town school Glencoe has been Hilhi's arch-rival since Glencoe became the second high school in the district in 1980. The football rivalry was featured on the Great American Rivalries series in October 2007. Teams play for bragging rights at the shared Hare Field. The 2009 game featured a 61-yard Hail Mary pass at the end of the game caught by Colt Lyerla for a touchdown after time expired to give Hilhi the victory. The play was named as ESPN's top play of the day and of the week. That season the team finished ranked number one in their classification and won the state title, the first in football since 1973.

Mouse Davis, an early proponent of the run and shoot offense, coached Hillsboro High to the 1973 football state championship. Oregon Sports Hall of Fame coach Ad Rutschman coached the baseball team from 1955 to 1968 before moving on to Linfield College.  Rutschman also led the Spartans to a state championship in football in 1966 with a 17–2 victory over South Salem.

Since 1965, the school has used Hare Field for football, baseball, and track.

OSAA State Championships

Team titles
 Wrestling: 1952, 1990
 Baseball: 1962 (tie), 1966, 1968, 1993
 Football: 1966, 1973, 2009
 Girls' basketball: 1979, 1980
 Girls' cross-country: 1979
 Boys' soccer: 2006
 Boys' swimming: 2017

Student life
The school previously held a homecoming king and queen ceremony, but this was terminated by the student government in 2016. Beth Graser, the chief of communications of the school district, stated that the move was made to prevent a popularity contest from occurring, while the class president of the 12th grade and the student government adviser stated it was done to make student culture more inclusive for genderqueer individuals.

Notable alumni

 Bob Beall, baseball player
 Scott Brow, baseball pitcher
 Rick Dancer, television anchor and politician
 David Edwards, politician
 Thomas Garrigus, Olympic athlete
 Tom Hughes, politician
 Josh Inman, Olympic athlete
 Bill Kellar, football player
 David Larsen, actor
 Colt Lyerla, football player
 Tiffeny Milbrett, Olympic soccer player
 Adolf Rutschman football/baseball coach
 Wes Schulmerich, baseball player
 Bruce Starr, politician
 Bryce Zabel, television producer

See also
Rood Bridge Park

References

High schools in Washington County, Oregon
Schools in Hillsboro, Oregon
International Baccalaureate schools in Oregon
Public high schools in Oregon
1913 establishments in Oregon
Educational institutions established in 1913
Hillsboro School District